Nosy or Nosey is an adjective for a person who is overly inquisitive about other people's affairs. It may also refer to:


Arts and entertainment
 Nosy (album), a 2009 studio album by the Portuguese singer Gomo
 "Nosey", nickname of Aloysius Parker, a fictional character in the British mid-1960s television series Thunderbirds and several films
 Nosey Barbon, a character in the 1958 British film The Horse's Mouth
 Nosey, original name of Snitch, a character in The Numskulls comic strip
 Mr. Nosey, the protagonist and title of the fourth book in the Mr. Men children's series, by Roger Hargreaves
 Nosey, a TV series on children's programming block Milkshake! from 1997 to 2002

Other uses
 Nosy, Piaseczno County, Poland, a village
 "Nosey", a nickname for Arthur Wellesley, 1st Duke of Wellington (1769-1852)
 "Nosey", nickname of Art Gauthier (1904-1977), Canadian ice hockey player
 Nosey, an elephant which lived in the Fresno Chaffee Zoo from 1949 to 1993

See also
 Golden Nosey, an annual International Society of Caricature Artists award

Lists of people by nickname